The men's 4 x 400 metres relay event at the 2013 Summer Universiade was held on 11–12 July.

Medalists

Results

Heats
Qualification: First 3 teams of each heat (Q) plus the next 2 fastest (q) qualified for the final.

Final

References

Relay
2013